Gateway Theatre of Shopping or Gateway is a shopping centre located on uMhlanga Ridge in uMhlanga, north of Durban, KwaZulu-Natal, South Africa. Gateway Theatre of Shopping is one of the top 100 largest malls in the world. .

Gateway sees more than two million visitors coming through its doors per month. The centre was modelled on the Mall of America and West Edmonton Mall centres and was developed by Old Mutual Properties.

The construction and opening of Gateway Theatre of Shopping has also been the driving force for many new developments in the area. Originally a sugar cane plantation, the establishment of Gateway on the site has led to the development of a new town centre and both commercial and residential developments within the region. There is also a hotel attached to the mall called the Gateway Hotel operated by AHA Hotels.

Mall contents
Since opening in 2001, Gateway Theatre of Shopping has brought the latest retail trends, best fashion and lifestyle brands and a world of entertainment to KwaZulu-Natal. Every year, the super-regional mall attracts over two million visitors to its 380 world-class stores, selection of 70 eateries and premier cinema complex. With ample parking and easy access on Umhlanga Ridge, Gateway is the established first choice for both tourists and locals visiting with families or friends, to meet, shop, eat out, mingle and play.
https://www.gatewayworld.co.za/about-us/

References

External links
 Gateway official site

Buildings and structures completed in 2001
Shopping centres in Durban
Shopping malls established in 2001
2001 establishments in South Africa
21st-century architecture in South Africa